Rev. is a British television sitcom produced by Big Talk Productions. Written by actor Tom Hollander and James Wood, the show premiered on BBC Two on 28 June 2010 and ended on 28 April 2014. The show's working titles were The City Vicar and Handle with Prayer. The series revolves around a Church of England priest, played by Hollander, who becomes the vicar of an inner-city London church after leaving a small rural Suffolk parish.

Hollander said: "we wanted to define ourselves in opposition to the cliché of a country vicar, partly because we wanted to depict England as it is now, rather than having a sort of bucolic-y, over the hills and far away, bird-tweeting England – we wanted the complications of the multi-cultural, multi-ethnic inner-city, where everything is much harder."

Plot
The Reverend Adam Smallbone is an Anglican priest who has moved from a small rural parish to the "socially disunited" St Saviour in the Marshes in Hackney, East London. Unwilling to turn anyone away from his pastoral care, he is faced with a series of moral challenges as he balances the needs of genuine believers, people on the streets, and drug addicts, as well as the demands of social climbers using the church to get their children into the best schools.

Adam has a difficult job as a modern city vicar. His wife Alex, who has her own career as a solicitor to worry about, supports him through his life as a priest, while not being engaged with his work. He is also supported by lay reader Nigel, who believes he should be running the church. In supervision is Archdeacon Robert, who puts pressure on Adam to increase the congregation and church income.

Parishioners include Colin, a heavy drinking, unemployable lost soul who is Adam's most devoted parishioner; Adoha, known for her romantic intentions towards the clergy; and Mick, who is homeless and appears on Adam's doorstep in different situations asking for money.

Bible references

The programme depicts a number of themes which reach their denouement at the end of Season 3. These plotlines reflect both a view of the contemporary C of E Church in London, but also echo familiar narrative from the New Testament. This is notable in a storyline which sees Adam Smallbone reluctantly return to his now deconsecrated St Saviour's Church, with the series most prominent characters, to lead an unofficial Easter Mass carried out after breaking into the Church, and to eventually baptise his infant daughter. By this time, we have seen stories that echo those of Judas Iscariat's betrayal of Christ in the story of Nigel, Peter's thrice denying Christ in the story of Colin, Christ's relationship with Mary Magdalene in the story of Ellie, his 40 days in exile in his suspension pending the investigation of his affair, the encounter with the moneylenders in the Temple in Adam's meeting with the area Dean and Diocesan Secretary as they assess the real estate value of the Church, and in Adam's downfall, the bearing of the cross to Calvary, before, in the Easter ceremony, his eventual Resurrection. Other characters also fulfil roles that refer to figures in the New Testament.

Future

Interviewed in April 2014, Tom Hollander said that he did not know whether there would be a fourth series, and that after the third series "we all want to just pause". He added that "The idea of not doing it any more is sad but also quite attractive, because you wouldn't want for it to ever get worse."

Cast and characters

Main
 Tom Hollander as Adam Smallbone
 Olivia Colman as Alexandra (Alex) Smallbone
 Steve Evets as Colin Lambert
 Miles Jupp as Nigel McCall
 Ellen Thomas as Adoha Onyeka
 Lucy Liemann as Ellie Pattman
 Simon McBurney as Archdeacon Robert

Recurring
 Hugh Bonneville as Roland Wise (Series 1-3)
 Jimmy Akingbola as Mick (Series 1–3)
 Ben Willbond as Steve Warwick (Series 1–3)
 Sylvia Syms as Joan (Series 2)
 Ralph Fiennes as Bishop of London (Series 2-3)
 Vicki Pepperdine as Geri Tennison (Series 3)
 Joanna Scanlan as Jill Mallory (Series 3)

Production

Six episodes were produced for the first series by Big Talk Productions for BBC Two. The show was created by Tom Hollander and James Wood. The church scenes were filmed at St Leonard's in Shoreditch, east London. The BBC Two comedy was renewed by the BBC in September 2010 and filming began again in the middle of 2011, with the second series of seven episodes premiering in November 2011. In August 2012, the show was renewed for a third series of six episodes, which aired in 2014.

Richard Coles, a Church of England priest and former member of the pop group the Communards, was one of several priests, including Rev. Kevin Sculley of St Matthew's, Bethnal Green, who advised the show's writers. Coles has been cited as an inspiration for the Adam Smallbone character.

Episode list

Series 1 (2010)

Series 2 (2011)

Series 3 (2014)
The six episodes of Series 3 commenced filming on 31 October 2013 and premiered on 24 March 2014.

Reception
The series was commended by The Independent as intelligent comedy, with Hollander "as good as ever" and a strong support cast.

In 2011, Rev. won the South Bank Award for Best Comedy and was nominated for the Royal Television Society Programme Awards for Best Scripted Comedy and Best Comedy Performance (Hollander).

At the 2011 British Academy Television Awards, the series won Best Sitcom, with Hollander also nominated for Best Male Comedy Performance. Both were nominated again in the same categories the following year, without winning. At the 2015 British Academy Television Awards, Hollander and Colman were nominated for Best Male Comedy Performance and Best Female Comedy Performance respectively.

DVD releases
The complete first series was released on DVD by 2 Entertain on 21 November 2011.

The second series was released on 19 November 2012. A boxset containing the first two series was also released.

The third series was released on 5 May 2014, a week after transmission of the final episode. A boxset containing the first three series was also released.

References

External links

2010 British television series debuts
2014 British television series endings
2010s British sitcoms
BAFTA winners (television series)
BBC television sitcoms
English-language television shows
Religious comedy television series
Television shows set in London
Television series by Big Talk Productions
Television series about Christian religious leaders